Gertie Florentine Marx (1912-2004) was an obstetric anesthesiologist, "internationally known as 'the mother of obstetric anaesthesia'". Marx pioneered the use of epidural analgesia during childbirth, and was the founding editor of the quarterly Obstetric Anesthesia Digest.

Life
Gertie Marx was born in Frankfurt on February 13, 1912 and attended medical school at the University of Frankfurt. A Jew, she emigrated to Switzerland in 1936 and completed her medical studies at the University of Bern, graduating in 1937. Later that year she travelled on to the United States and settled in New York City. In 1939 she secured an internship at Beth Israel Hospital, and in 1940 became the first resident in a new anesthesiology residency program at the hospital. In 1943 she joined the attending staff at Beth Israel Medical Center. In 1955 she moved to the Albert Einstein College of Medicine, and remained there until retirement as Emeritus Professor in 1995.As well as the books listed below, Marx authored over 150 articles and many textbook chapters.

References

1912 births
2004 deaths
American anesthesiologists
American obstetricians
German expatriates in Switzerland
Jewish emigrants from Nazi Germany to the United States
Goethe University Frankfurt alumni
University of Bern alumni
Albert Einstein College of Medicine faculty